Călărași, the capital of Călărași County in the Muntenia region, is situated in south-east Romania, on the banks of the Danube's Borcea branch, at about  from the Bulgarian border and  from Bucharest.

The city is an industrial centre for lumber and paper, food processing, glass manufacturing, textiles, medical equipment production, and heavy industry, the last one represented by the Călărași steel works. The city is known colloquially as "Capșa provinciei" (the Capșa from the provinces).

History

The site of a medieval village, called Lichirești from the time of Michael the Brave. Călărași appeared for the first time in 1700 on a map drawn by Constantin Cantacuzino. It got its name after it was made by the Wallachian princes, in the 17th century, a station of "mounted couriers' service" on the route from Bucharest to Constantinople. The service was operated by horseback riders (the călărași). It expanded into a small town, and in 1834 became the surrounding county's capital.

Transportation
Călărași is connected by National Roads DN3, DN21, DN31, and DN3B. Also A2 ("The Sun's Motorway") has 3 exits for Călărași, at Lehliu Gară (about  NW), Dragalina (about  N) and Fetești (about  NE). The Călărași train station serves the  CFR Line 802. The nearest major cities are: Bucharest , Constanța , and Varna .

Education

The city features seven middle schools and several high schools, including
 Barbu Știrbei National College
 Mihai Eminescu Theoretical High School
 Ștefan Bănulescu Technical High School
 Danubius High School
 Sandu Aldea Agricultural College
 Călărași Economics College

Sports
The city is currently represented by Dunărea Călărași in the Romanian Liga II football league.

Natives
 Ștefan Bănică Sr. (1933–1995), actor, singer
 Daniel Bogdan (b. 1971), footballer
 Mircea Ciumara (1943–2012), politician
 Vladimir Constantinescu (1895–1965), general
 Maria Cuțarida-Crătunescu (1857–1919), first female doctor in Romania
 Daniel Florea (b. 1972), politician
 Petre V. Haneș (1879–1966), literary historian
  (1911–2008), engineer, titular member of the Romanian Academy
 Marius Mocanu (b. 1986), handballer
 Barbu Nemțeanu (1887–1919), poet
 Gabriel Popa (b. 1985), footballer
 Dragoș Protopopescu (1892–1948), writer, poet
 Gabriel Simion (b. 1991), footballer

International relations

Twin towns — Sister cities
Călărași is twinned with:

Climate 

Population 

In 2011, Călărași had a population of 65,181, with 95.05% of them declaring themselves as being Romanians and 3.59% Roma. The surrounding communes (Modelu, Ostrov, Roseți, Grădiștea, Cuza-Vodă, and Ștefan Vodă) together with Călărași number almost 100,000 inhabitants.

References

External links 

 

 
Populated places on the Danube
Port cities and towns in Romania
Bulgaria–Romania border crossings
Cities in Romania
Capitals of Romanian counties
Populated places in Călărași County
Localities in Muntenia